Avril Lavigne: My World is the first live album/DVD by Canadian singer-songwriter Avril Lavigne, released on November 6, 2003. The DVD consists of 16 songs that Lavigne performed on her first live performance tour, the Try to Shut Me Up Tour at HSBC Arena in Buffalo, New York. Most of the tracks are taken from her debut album, Let Go, while two of the songs are covers. It also features one B-side song. On the live CD, three songs are covers and one is a single.

Critical reception
Holly E. Ordway from DVD Talk website commented positively on Lavigne’s performance, stating that Lavigne “moves from one song to the next with minimal fuss, focusing her concert performance on her music rather than putting on an ‘act’ in general”. The audio quality of the DVD was assessed as unsatisfyingly monaural, less immersive than Lavigne's CDs. Ordway was critical of the bonus features on the DVD, believing that they would only interest a “devoted teenage fan”.

Track listing
Taken from the back casing of Avril Lavigne: My World US DVD release.

Personnel 
Credits adapted from Avril Lavigne: My World DVD liner notes.

 Avril Lavigne – vocals, guitar
 Evan Taubenfeld – lead guitar
 Mathew Braunn – drums
 Jesse Colburn – guitar
 Charles Moniz – bass guitar
 Brent Muhle – Nettmedia
 John Stavropolous – Nettmedia
 Tomas Larsson – Nettmedia
 Maria Gililova – Nettmedia
 Bill Harris – Nettmedia
 Jason Rosenthal – Nettmedia
 Mark Ashkinos – Scream DVD
 Jason Wishnow – Scream DVD
 Rodney Ascher – Scream DVD
 Travis Oscarson – Scream DVD
 Marc Bachli – Fini Films Inc.
 Shamus Hewitt – 369 Productions, documentary, DVD photos
 Hamish Hamilton – director
 Done and Dusted – producer
 Shauna Gold – manager
 Dan Garnett – tour manager
 Paul Runnals – production manager
 Hugo Rempel – production assistant
 Craig "Fin" Finley – tour accountant
 Shannon Reddy – personal assistant
 Joe Self – head security
 Brent Pollock – venue security
 Dave Heard – rigger
 Graeme Nicol – lighting director
 Mark LeCorre – FOH engineer
 Dave Pallett – monitor engineer
 George Widule – backline tech
 Martin Brown – backline tech
 Bippin Sammy – head carpenter
 Ken Hollands – carpenter
 Dale Lynch – lighting crew chief
 Terry Mueller – lighting system tech
 Ryan Kell – automation system tech
 Dave Retson – audio crew chief
 Jamie Howieson – audio FOH tech
 Shaun Racette – audio system tech
 Bill Crooks – video director/crew chief
 Barrie Roney – video system tech
 Dave Franzen – camera operator
 Will Craig – camera operator
 Mikee Cusack – merchandise
 Brian Eaton – merchandise
 Marty Kell – merchandise
 Glenn Jones – bus driver
 JP Newton – bus driver
 Steve Headley – bus driver
 Herb Colledge – bus driver
 Al Smith – lead truck driver
 Mike Love – truck driver
 Aaron Scheidt – truck driver
 Norm Bailey – truck driver
 Perry Manzuk – truck driver
 Jeffrey Schulz – DVD cover design
 Kim Kinakin – DVD package design
 Kharen Hill – cover photo, DVD photos
 David Leyes – backcover photos, inside photos, DVD photos
 Steve Jennings – backcover photos, DVD photos
 Fryderyk Gabowicz – backcover photos, DVD photos
 Cline – DVD photos

Charts

Certifications
DVD

Awards

References

2003 video albums
Avril Lavigne video albums
2003 live albums
Live video albums
Arista Records live albums
Arista Records video albums